Falls High School is a public high school located in International Falls, Minnesota, United States.  The school's class ring design is the oldest class ring tradition in the United States, dating back to 1929. As of 2014 approximately 600 students attend classes in the school. Every grade level ranges from 70-100 students. In the Fall of 2014 the school changed policies and  changed over from a 6 period day to a 7 period day. The students have 5 minutes between each class to maneuver to the next one.

Included on campus are a sports arena for hockey (also used for spring and fall sports training), football practice fields, and track field, several baseball and softball diamonds, and a swimming pool.  There is a parking lot for students who use their own vehicles to travel to school (all it requires is a sticker in the window that students can sign up for in the office). There is also a separate lot for teachers parking.

The current principal is Tim Everson and the athletic director is Bill Mason.

Falls high school is on the border of the United States and Canada at the most northern part of Koochiching County.

The Falls' rival school is variant for different sports, but typically a good battle between the Hibbing High School in Hibbing, Minnesota.

As of the 201011 school year, the school had an enrollment of 658 students and 34 classroom teachers (on an FTE basis), for a student-teacher ratio of 20.08.

Clubs
Clubs offered at Falls High School include:Bowling, FACS, Freshman, Sophomore, Junior, and Senior Class Committees, Knowledge Bowl, Ojibwe Quiz Bowl, Math Team, National Honor Society, Speech Team, FIRST Robotics Competition, and Student Council.

Adding onto the Bowling. On May 22, 2021, The combined International Falls/Indus/Lake of The Woods team won the 2021 Minnesota State High School Class A bowling tournament at AMF Southtown Lanes in Bloomington, MN

Sports
Sports offered by the school include cheerleading, swimming and diving, basketball, volleyball, cross country, hockey, football, baseball, softball, track and field.  Athletes have the name Broncos, named after Falls High attendee Bronko Nagurski. The colors are purple, gold, and white.

Fall sports
Girls: Cross Country, Volleyball, Swimming and Diving
Boys: Cross Country, Football (Cheerleader)

Winter sports
Girls: Hockey, Basketball
Boys: Hockey (Cheerleader), Basketball (Cheerleader), Swimming and Diving

Spring sports
Girls: Track and Field, Softball, Golf
Boys: Track and Field, Baseball, Golf

References

External links

 Falls High School

Public high schools in Minnesota
Schools in Koochiching County, Minnesota
1958 establishments in Minnesota
Educational institutions established in 1958